Verónica Orozco is the eponymous debut studio album by Colombian actress and singer Verónica Orozco. It was released in Colombia on 14 July 2006 by EMI Music. Production for the album came primarily from Iván Benavides, alongside Bernardo Ossa. The album was certified gold in Orozco's home country.

Track listing

Personnel 
Verónica Orozco – performer, lyricist, backing vocals
Tom Coyne – mastering
Iván Benavides – keyboard programming, sample programming, backing vocals
Bernardo Ossa – producer
Raul Higuera – photography

References

2006 debut albums
Verónica Orozco albums